Tang Yik Chun (born 23 June 1986) is a Hong Kong sprinter. He competed in the 4 × 100 m relay event at the 2012 Summer Olympics.

References

Hong Kong male sprinters
1986 births
Living people
Olympic athletes of Hong Kong
Athletes (track and field) at the 2012 Summer Olympics
Athletes (track and field) at the 2006 Asian Games
Athletes (track and field) at the 2010 Asian Games
Athletes (track and field) at the 2014 Asian Games
Athletes (track and field) at the 2018 Asian Games
World Athletics Championships athletes for Hong Kong
Asian Games medalists in athletics (track and field)
Asian Games bronze medalists for Hong Kong
Medalists at the 2014 Asian Games
21st-century Hong Kong people